Marilyn Martin (born May 4, 1954) is an American singer and songwriter. She is best known for her 1985 hit duet with Phil Collins, "Separate Lives", her only number one.

Early life
Marilyn Martin was born on May 4, 1954, in Tennessee but raised in Louisville, Kentucky. She was exposed to different genres of music as a child. Her father was a country and bluegrass fan, her mother liked R&B and her grandmother sang gospel. At age 18 she started singing with different bands, eventually joining one from Akron, Ohio. After five years of club gigs, the band had an opportunity to tour with Joe Walsh, who was headlining with Stevie Nicks. Also on the tour were Michael McDonald, Boz Scaggs, and Kenny Loggins. After the tour, Martin moved to Los Angeles, California, and began a prolific career as a backing vocalist for artists including Stevie Nicks, Joe Walsh, Don Henley, Tom Petty and Kenny Loggins.

Career
Martin became a protégée of Doug Morris, the then-head of Atlantic, who had heard her backing vocals on Nicks' album, Rock a Little, and was impressed enough to ask for a demo. She recorded the Nicks' song "Sorcerer" (on which Nicks sang backing vocals) for the Jim Steinman soundtrack of the 1984 film Streets of Fire. Morris signed Martin to a two-album recording contract and connected her with Phil Collins for "Separate Lives," part of the soundtrack for the 1985 film White Nights. The song was a number one hit in the U.S. and a Top 5 hit in the United Kingdom.

Martin's self-titled debut album was released in January 1986, reaching number 72 on the Billboard 200, with the single "Night Moves" reaching number 28 on the Billboard Hot 100. Two other singles were also released from the album, "Body and the Beat" and "Move Closer," but neither charted. Her second album, This Is Serious, was released in 1988, with its lead single "Possessive Love" written and produced by Madonna and Patrick Leonard. The single "Love Takes No Prisoners" was released as well, with the ballad "Quiet Desperation" as the B-side. The same year, Martin recorded the duet "And When She Danced", used in the movie Stealing Home.

Neither the singles nor the album were commercially successful, and Atlantic dropped her. She continued her career as a backing vocalist into the 1990s. In 1993, Martin moved to Nashville where she recorded a country album, Through His Eyes, for Atlantic in 1994. The album was never released, but is available through Martin's official website.

In 1997, Martin recorded a duet "I Live for Love" with David Hasselhoff, which appears on his album Hooked on a Feeling.

On September 14, 2012, Martin released the album Trust, Love, Pray, a Christian music album featuring songs written by Martin, including "Every Way and Always", which received airplay on Christian, Praise, and Worship stations.

Marilyn reunited with Stevie Nicks in October 2016, singing backup vocals for the 24 Karat Gold Tour and filling in for Lori Nicks. She continued working with Stevie Nicks, touring as a backing vocalist with Fleetwood Mac in 2019.

Personal life
Martin currently is a real estate agent in Nashville, where she lives with her husband (guitarist, music producer, and engineer) Greg Droman.

Discography

Studio albums
 Marilyn Martin (1986)
 This Is Serious (1988)
 Trust, Love, Pray (2012)

Unreleased album
 Through His Eyes (1994)

Singles
 "Sorcerer" – 1984, Streets of Fire soundtrack
 "Separate Lives" - 1985, duet with Phil Collins, No. 1 Billboard Hot 100 & No. 1 Adult Contemporary 
 "Night Moves" - 1986, No. 28 Billboard Hot 100 and No. 18 Album Rock Tracks (Mainstream Rock Tracks Chart)
 "Move Closer" – 1986
 "Body and the Beat" – 1986
 "Possessive Love" – 1988
 "Love Takes No Prisoners" – 1988
 "And When She Danced" - 1988, duet with David Foster (#73 Canada)
 "No Regrets"  – 1992, duet with Charles Dumont
 "Through His Eyes" – 1994

References

External links
 
 
 
 

1954 births
20th-century American singers
21st-century American singers
American women songwriters
Atlantic Records artists
American performers of Christian music
American real estate brokers
American pop rock singers
American soft rock musicians
American synth-pop musicians
American women country singers
American country singer-songwriters
Living people
Singer-songwriters from Tennessee
Singer-songwriters from Kentucky
Musicians from Louisville, Kentucky
Country musicians from Kentucky
Rock musicians from Kentucky
20th-century American women singers
Kentucky women musicians
Singers from Kentucky
21st-century American women singers
Country musicians from Tennessee